Stellantis N.V. is a multinational automotive manufacturing corporation formed in 2021 on the basis of a 50–50 cross-border merger between the Italian-American conglomerate Fiat Chrysler Automobiles (FCA) and the French PSA Group. The company is headquartered in Amsterdam.

In terms of global vehicle sales in 2021, Stellantis was the world's fifth-largest automaker behind Toyota, Volkswagen, Hyundai, and General Motors.

The primary listings for the company's stock are on Milan's Borsa Italiana and on Euronext Paris.

The principal activity of Stellantis is the design, development, manufacture and sale of automobiles bearing its 16 brands of Abarth, Alfa Romeo, Chrysler, Citroën, Dodge, DS, Fiat, Fiat Professional, Jeep, Lancia, Maserati, Mopar, Opel, Peugeot, Ram, and Vauxhall. At the time of the merger, Stellantis had approximately 300,000 employees, a presence in more than 130 countries with manufacturing facilities in 30 countries.

Etymology 
The name comes from the Latin verb stello, meaning "of (him/her/it) that brightens with stars".

History 
In early 2019, Fiat Chrysler Automobiles (FCA) sought a merger with French automaker Renault and reached a provisional agreement with the company. However, the behaviour of the French government during negotiations led to the abandonment of the deal; The Economist reported that "for FCA this portended future interference". Nissan also had various concerns of the impact of the proposal on its alliance with Renault.

Subsequently, FCA approached Peugeot S.A. (PSA). The merger, officially agreed to in December 2019, was to create the world's fourth-largest carmaker by global vehicle sales with expected annual cost savings of €3.7 billion, or about US$4.22 billion.

On 21 December 2020, the European Commission approved the merger, while imposing minimal remedies to ensure competition in the sector.

The merger was approved on 4 January 2021 by the shareholders of both FCA and PSA, and the deal was completed on 16 January 2021. Common shares of the new company began trading on the Milan Stock Exchange and Euronext Paris on 18 January 2021 and on the New York Stock Exchange on 19 January 2021, in each case under the ticker symbol "STLA".

PSA merged with and into Fiat Chrysler Automobiles N.V., with Fiat Chrysler Automobiles N.V. as the surviving company in the merger. On 17 January 2021, the combined company was renamed Stellantis N.V. International Financial Reporting Standards, or IFRS, mandate the identification of the company acting as the acquirer and the company being acquired; Peugeot is considered the acquirer for accounting purposes, and statements reflect PSA's historical records. Per the filing, the Stellantis board had 11 directors, six from PSA and five from Fiat Chrysler. Additionally, the new company's first CEO,  vested with full authority to represent Stellantis, was Carlos Tavares, the former president of the PSA managing board, as well as former CEO of PSA Group, with a five-year term as Stellantis CEO. PSA shareholders paid a pre-merger premium to FCA shareholders. However, Exor, the Agnelli family company that was the largest shareholder of FCA, held the largest stake in Stellantis with 14.4%. The merger agreements allowed the Peugeot family to increase its current 7.2% stake in Stellantis by up to an additional 1.5% by acquiring shares from France's state lender Bpifrance, from Dongfeng, or on the market.

The name Stellantis is exclusively used to identify the corporate entity, while group brand names and logos remain unchanged.

In 2021, CEO Carlos Tavares issued a challenge for the group's brands to prove themselves within a 10-year window, in exchange for much-needed investment in new models and technology.

The group planned to have 29 electrified vehicle models available by the end of 2021. Stellantis planned to develop four EV platforms  by the end of the 2020s. Overall, the company announced more than €30bn will be invested by the end of 2021. A network of charging stations started in November 2021.

In the third quarter of 2021, Stellantis sales of new vehicles dropped due to issues related to the supply chain shortage of semiconductor chips used in their vehicles. Stellantis made an agreement with semiconductor manufacturer Foxconn to supply chips for the company and others in the  automotive industry. In June 2022 the company paused production at two French plants due to shortages in semiconductors.

In May 2022, Stellantis pled guilty to criminal conduct and paid $300 million to settle a probe into its effort to illegally conceal the amount of pollution created by its diesel-engined vehicles. This settled a years-long probe by the United States Department of Justice into the auto maker's efforts to evade emissions requirements for more than 100,000 older models.

On 8 July 2022, Stellantis acquired the carsharing platform Share Now. Stellantis placed Share Now's operational management under Free2Move.

In November 2022, Stellantis acquired the Budapest-headquartered autonomous vehicle technology company, aiMotive.

On 15 February 2023, Stellantis said it will establish a new software development and engineering hub in Gliwice, Poland.

Brands 
As of 2022, the active brand portfolio of Stellantis is shown below. Note this list does not contain any discontinued brands owned by the company which have been placed into dormancy either directly or by its predecessor organisations.

Notes

Ownership 
Following the 50% FCA and 50% PSA merger, the owners were:
 Agnelli family (Exor N.V.): 14.40%
 Peugeot family (Etablissements Peugeot Frères, EPF): 7.19%
 Bpifrance: 6.18%
 Dongfeng Motor Corporation: 4.5%
 BlackRock: 2.52%

Leadership

Senior management 

 Chairman: John Elkann (since January 2021)
 Chief Executive: Carlos Tavares (since January 2021)
 Vice Chairman: Robert Peugeot (since January 2021)

Board of directors 
The executive board of Stellantis is formed by 11 members. Six members come from PSA and leading shareholders (BpiFrance, FFP), included Carlos Tavares, former CEO of PSA, and five others come from Fiat Chrysler Automobiles and main shareholder (Exor).

Assembly plants

Africa 
 Algeria: Oran (since March 2023)
 Morocco: Kenitra (PSA Kenitra plant)
 Namibia: Walvis Bay, Erongo
 Nigeria: Kaduna

Asia 
 China:
 Wuhan, Hubei (50-50 joint venture with Dongfeng)
 Chengdu, Sichuan (50-50 joint venture with Dongfeng)
 India:
 Ranjangaon, Maharashtra
 Thiruvallur, Tamil Nadu
 Gachibowli, Telangana (Global Digital Hub upcoming)
 Hosur, Tamil Nadu (Powertrains; 50-50 joint venture with AVTEC)
 Iran:
 Tehran, (IKAP; 50-50 joint venture with Iran Khodro)
 Kashan, (50-50 joint venture with SAIPA)
 Malaysia: Gurun, Kedah
 Turkey: Bursa (Tofaş; 38-38 joint venture with Koç Holding)

Europe 
 Austria:
 Vienna (Opel Wien)
 France:
 Sausheim, Grand Est (Stellantis Mulhouse Plant)
 Poissy, Île-de-France (Stellantis Poissy Plant)
 Rennes, Brittany (Stellantis Rennes Plant)
 Sochaux, Bourgogne-Franche-Comté (Stellantis Sochaux Plant)
 Hordain, Hauts-de-France (Sevel Nord)
 Germany:

 Eisenach, Thuringia (Opel Eisenach)
 Rüsselsheim, Hesse (Opel Rüsselsheim)
 Kaiserslautern, Rhineland-Palatinate (Opel Kaiserslautern) 
 Hungary:
 Szentgotthárd (Opel Szentgotthárd)
 Italy:
 Turin (Stellantis Mirafiori)
 Grugliasco (Avvocato Giovanni Agnelli Plant) closing
 Piedimonte San Germano (Stellantis Cassino)
 Modena (Maserati)
 Pomigliano d'Arco (Stellantis Pomigliano)
 Melfi (SATA)
 Atessa (Sevel Sud)
 Termoli (Termoli Powertrain Plant)
 Poland:

 Bielsko-Biała, Silesia
 Gliwice, Silesia
 Tychy, Silesia
 Skoczów, Silesia
 Portugal: Mangualde (Stellantis Mangualde Plant)
 Serbia: Kragujevac, Šumadija and Western Serbia (FCA Serbia)
 Slovakia: Trnava (Stellantis Trnava Plant)
 Spain:
 Madrid
 Vigo, Galicia (Stellantis Vigo Plant)
 Figueruelas, Aragon (Opel Zaragoza Plant)
 United Kingdom:
 Ellesmere Port, Cheshire (Vauxhall Ellesmere Port)
 Luton, Bedfordshire (Vauxhall Luton)

North America 
 Canada:
 Brampton, Ontario (Brampton Assembly)
 Windsor, Ontario (Windsor Assembly)
 Mexico:
 Saltillo, Coahuila (Saltillo Truck Assembly)
 Saltillo, Coahuila (Saltillo Van Assembly)
 Saltillo, Coahuila (Saltillo South Engine Plant)
 Toluca (Toluca Car Assembly)
 United States:
 Belvidere, Illinois (Belvidere Assembly Plant) (Closing in February 2023)
 Kokomo, Indiana (Engine & Transmission assembly complex)
 Detroit, Michigan (Jefferson North Assembly) Detroit Assembly Complex - Jefferson
 Detroit, Michigan, (Detroit Assembly Complex - Mack)
 Sterling Heights, Michigan (Sterling Heights Assembly)
 Warren, Michigan (Warren Truck Assembly)
 Toledo, Ohio (Toledo Complex)
 Dundee, Michigan (Dundee Engine Plant)
 Trenton, Michigan (Trenton Engine Plant)

South America 
 Argentina:
 El Palomar, Buenos Aires
 Ferreyra, Córdoba
 Brazil:
 Betim, Minas Gerais
 Goiana, Pernambuco
 Porto Real, Rio de Janeiro
 Venezuela: Valencia, Carabobo

Oceania 
 Australia:
 Clayton South converts Ram vehicles from left-hand to right-hand drive.

Former plants 

 Russia
 Kaluga (PCMA), closed in April 2022 following the invasion of Ukraine by Russia

Motorsport
Stellantis Motorsport is a department led by Director and Senior Vice President, Jean-Marc Finot. It is responsible for the motorsport activities of the corporation's brands, divisions and subsidiaries;

 Citroën Racing
 Commercial operation focusing on customer racing with the Citroën C3 Rally2, although known to be supporting entries in WRC2
 DS Performance
 Entrant in Formula E World Championship
 Maserati
 Entrant in Formula E World Championship
 Opel Motorsport
 Manufacturer of the electric rally car, Opel Corsa-e Rally, and organiser of its Opel e-Rally Cup
 Commercial operation focusing on customer racing with the Opel Corsa Rally4
 Peugeot Sport
 Entrant of the FIA World Endurance Championship
 Commercial operation focusing on customer racing with the Peugeot 208 Rally4
Except for Maserati, the four remaining brands belonged to PSA Motorsport, a department of the former PSA Group before the creation of Stellantis.

The Stellantis Motorsport Racing Shop combines Citroën Racing, Peugeot Sport and Opel Motorsports' customer racing distribution and retail sales operations. It is also known as Peugeot Citroën Racing Shop, and Peugeot Citroën Opel Racing Shop.

The Stellantis Motorsport Cup is a rally competition run in Belgium, France and Spain, using Peugeot 208 and Opel Corsa Rally4 cars. The cup originated in Belgium and Luxembourg as PSA Motorsport Cup Belux.

See also 
 List of Stellantis platforms

Explanatory notes

References

External links 
 
 STELLANTIS: The name of the new group resulting from the merger of FCA and Groupe PSA, joint press release of FCA and PSA

 
2021 establishments in the Netherlands
Vehicle manufacturing companies established in 2021
Companies listed on the Borsa Italiana
Companies listed on Euronext Paris
Companies listed on the New York Stock Exchange
Holding companies of the Netherlands
Manufacturing companies established in 2021
Multinational companies headquartered in the Netherlands
Motor vehicle engine manufacturers
Electric vehicle manufacturers of the Netherlands
Luxury motor vehicle manufacturers
CAC 40
Companies in the Euro Stoxx 50
Diesel engine manufacturers
Automotive transmission makers